Adolph Louis Camilli (April 23, 1907 – October 21, 1997) was an American first baseman in Major League Baseball who spent most of his career with the Philadelphia Phillies and Brooklyn Dodgers. He was named the National League's Most Valuable Player in  after leading the league in home runs and runs batted in as the Dodgers won the pennant for the first time since 1920. He was the ninth National League player to hit 200 career home runs, and held the Dodgers franchise record for career home runs from 1942 to 1953. His son Doug was a major league catcher in the 1960s. His brother, who boxed under the name Frankie Campbell, died of a cerebral hemorrhage following a 1930 match with Max Baer.

Major league career
Born and raised in San Francisco, California, Camilli attended Sacred Heart Cathedral Preparatory. He had an eight-year minor league career before making his major league debut with the Chicago Cubs at the end of the  season. He was traded to the Phillies in June 1934, and in each year from 1935 to 1937 he hit 25 or more home runs, batting a career-high .339 and leading the National League in on-base percentage in the last season. But he also had a free-swinging style that led to numerous strikeouts; in his  rookie season, he tied Hack Wilson's modern National League record of 94 strikeouts, and in  he set a new league mark with 113.

In March 1938, Camilli was traded to the Dodgers in a move that new general manager Larry MacPhail hoped would spark a change in the team's image from lovable losers to solid contenders. He drove in 100 or more runs in four of the next five seasons, being named an All-Star in 1939 and 1941 and becoming team captain. He also led the National League in walks in 1938 and 1939, but in the latter year became the first player to have three 100-strikeout seasons. In 1941, he again led the league with 115 strikeouts and also surpassed Rabbit Maranville's National League career record of 756. He also set career-highs in home runs (34) and runs batted in (120), leading the league in both categories. However, in the 1941 World Series, he batted just .167 with only 1 run batted in as the Dodgers lost to the New York Yankees in five games.

In , he finished second in the National League in home runs and runs batted in. In July 1943 Camilli was traded to the New York Giants, but he refused to report to the Dodgers' hated rivals; instead, he managed the Oakland Oaks of the Pacific Coast League in 1944–45 before joining the Boston Red Sox in mid-, batting .212 with two home runs in his last season.

In a 12-season career, Camilli posted a .277 batting average with 239 home runs and 950 runs batted in during 1490 games played. After leading the National League in errors in both 1934 and 1935, and setting a record with three errors in one inning in 1935, he improved his defense and later led the league in assists and fielding percentage once each. He recorded a .990 fielding percentage playing every inning in his major league career at first base. Among his career highlights was recording the last out of Ruth's career.

Later life
Following his playing career, Camilli returned to the Pacific Coast League and managed the Oaks and Sacramento Solons, as well as several other minor league teams, winning a pennant with Spokane in 1948. He later was a scout for the Yankees and California Angels before finishing his baseball career as a spring training instructor for the Angels.

And I don't know which one was the most important."

In an article in 1976 in Esquire magazine, sportswriter Harry Stein published an "All Time All-Star Argument Starter", consisting of five ethnic baseball teams. Camilli was the first baseman on Stein's Italian team.

Camilli died in San Mateo, California at age 90. He was buried at Cypress Lawn Memorial Park in Colma, California.

See also

List of Major League Baseball career home run leaders
List of Major League Baseball annual home run leaders
List of Major League Baseball annual runs batted in leaders
Dodgers Award Winners and League Leaders
List of athletes on Wheaties boxes
List of members of the Italian American Sports Hall of Fame
Bay Area Sports Hall of Fame

References

External links

Baseball Almanac

1907 births
1997 deaths
American people of Italian descent
Baseball players from San Francisco
Boston Red Sox players
Brooklyn Dodgers players
Burials at Cypress Lawn Memorial Park
California Angels scouts
Chicago Cubs players
Logan Collegians players
Major League Baseball first basemen
National League All-Stars
National League home run champions
National League Most Valuable Player Award winners
National League RBI champions
New York Yankees scouts
Oakland Athletics scouts
Oakland Oaks (baseball) managers
Oakland Oaks (baseball) players
Philadelphia Phillies players
Sacramento Senators players
Salt Lake City Bees players
San Francisco Seals (baseball) players
Spokane Indians managers